Emanuel Cleaver II (born October 26, 1944) is a United Methodist pastor and American politician who has represented  in the U.S. House of Representatives since 2005. 

Cleaver represents a district that includes the southern three-fourths of Kansas City, including all of the city south of the Missouri River, as well as the more rural counties of Lafayette, Ray, and Saline east of Jackson. He is a member of the Democratic Party, and chaired the Congressional Black Caucus from 2011 to 2013.

Before his election to Congress, Cleaver served three terms on the Kansas City Council from 1979 to 1991, until he was elected mayor, serving two terms from 1991 to 1999.

Early life, education, and career
Emanuel Cleaver II was born on October 26, 1944, in Waxahachie, Texas. He grew up in public housing in Wichita Falls, Texas. He graduated from Prairie View A&M University, where he was a member of Alpha Phi Alpha fraternity, in 1972. Cleaver then moved to Kansas City, Missouri, where he founded a branch of the Southern Christian Leadership Conference and received a Master of Divinity degree from St. Paul School of Theology.

Cleaver was the pastor at the St. James United Methodist Church in Kansas City, Missouri, from 1972 to 2009.

Kansas City councilman and mayor
Cleaver served as a Kansas City councilman from 1979 to 1991 and as mayor of Kansas City from 1991 until 1999. He was Kansas City's first African American mayor.

David Helling, an opinion columnist for the Kansas City Star, wrote of Cleaver's tenure as mayor: "Kansas City's first African-American mayor defined the modern concept of the job: a professional staff, high visibility and a clear agenda. He was also a moral leader. His speech at a local rally after the Rodney King verdict averted a riot and was his finest moment. Yet Cleaver's actual record as mayor is spotty. Tax and spending initiatives floundered at the polls, and City Hall scandal was common. The crime rate was far too high."

Cleaver is a cousin of exiled Kansas City Black Panther leader Pete O'Neal. In 1997, Cleaver unsuccessfully attempted to obtain a pardon for O'Neal from President Bill Clinton. Cleaver is also a cousin of the late Eldridge Cleaver, another prominent figure in the Black Panther Party.

U.S. House of Representatives
After the compromise Budget Control Act deal had been reached to resolve the 2011 debt-ceiling crisis, Cleaver called the deal a "sugar-coated Satan sandwich".

Committee assignments
Committee on Financial Services
Subcommittee on Insurance, Housing and Community Opportunity  (Chair)
Subcommittee on Domestic Monetary Policy and Technology
Select Committee on the Modernization of Congress

Caucus membership
Congressional Black Caucus

Tenure
During his tenure, Cleaver has voted with the Democratic Party 95.8% of the time. He has been recognized as "not shy about earmarks" and has brought many federal tax dollars back to Kansas City.

Cleaver has called for ethics charges against fellow U.S. Representatives Charlie Rangel and Maxine Waters to be dropped, saying, "The process has been tainted."

On December 18, 2019, Cleaver voted for both articles of impeachment against President Donald Trump and is one of only two Missouri House members to do so, along with Lacy Clay.

Office attack
On September 11, 2014, around 2:50 a.m., what appeared to be a Molotov cocktail was thrown through the window of Cleaver's Kansas City office. He was in Washington D.C. at the time and no staff members were present during the attack.

Political campaigns

In late 2003, Karen McCarthy, who had represented the 5th congressional district since 1995, announced her retirement. Though he served in city government for 20 years, including eight as mayor, Cleaver initially posted weak numbers in the Democratic primary and general elections, but defeated former Clinton Administration official Jamie Metzl in the Democratic primary, 60%-40%. In the general election, Republican Jeanne Patterson made the race far more competitive than conventional wisdom would suggest for the district, which has long been reckoned as Missouri's second-most Democratic district, behind the St. Louis-based 1st. The Democrats have held this seat for all but eight years since 1909, and without interruption since 1949. McCarthy won 65% of the vote in 2002.

2008 Democratic presidential primary election
During the 2008 Democratic presidential primaries, Cleaver endorsed Hillary Clinton. He claimed that African American superdelegates who supported Clinton were subjected to harassment, threatened with primary opponents and called "Uncle Tom." He said they were told, "'You’re not black if you’re not supporting Barack Obama' … It's ugly." On March 30, 2008, Cleaver said he realized he was on the losing team: "Even though I don't expect the Kansas City Chiefs to beat the Indianapolis Colts, I cheer for the Kansas City Chiefs." According to BlackMissouri.com., U.S. Representative Jesse Jackson Jr. of Illinois asked Cleaver, "If it comes down to the last day and you're the only superdelegate? … Do you want to go down in history as the one to prevent a black from winning the White House?" Cleaver said, "I told him I'd think about it." Cleaver said during the primary he'd be shocked if Obama wasn't the next president but made clear he still supported Clinton until she suspended her bid.

Electoral history

Personal life
Emanuel Cleaver and his wife, Dianne, have four children. They reside in Kansas City.

In 2000, a road in Kansas City was renamed Emanuel Cleaver II Boulevard. The new route consisted of Brush Creek Blvd., E. 47th St., and the portion of Van Brunt Blvd. south of 31st St.

In 2012, Bank of America sued Emanuel and Dianne Cleaver and Cleaver Company LLC, alleging that the company had defaulted on a $1.46 million commercial real estate loan obtained a decade earlier for a Grandview car wash. In 2013, the lawsuit was settled. Cleaver's congressional wages were garnished to repay the money owed.

See also
List of African-American United States representatives

References

External links

Congressman Emanuel Cleaver II official U.S. House website
Emanuel Cleaver for Congress

|-

|-

|-

1944 births
20th-century African-American politicians
African-American men in politics
20th-century American politicians
21st-century African-American politicians
21st-century American politicians
African-American Methodists
African-American mayors in Missouri
African-American members of the United States House of Representatives
African-American people in Missouri politics
American United Methodist clergy
American Methodists
Methodists from Missouri
Democratic Party members of the United States House of Representatives from Missouri
Living people
Mayors of Kansas City, Missouri
Missouri city council members
People from Waxahachie, Texas
People from Wichita Falls, Texas
Prairie View A&M University alumni
Saint Paul School of Theology alumni